Hoad is a surname. Notable people with the surname include:

John Charles Hoad (1856–1911), Australian soldier
Lew Hoad (1934–1994), Australian tennis player
Teddy Hoad (1896–1986), West Indian cricketer

See also
Hoad Monument, in Ulverston, north-west England